Lyubov Belyakova (born 10 December 1967) is a Russian biathlete. She competed in women's sprint event at the 1994 Winter Olympics.

References

External links
 

1967 births
Living people
Biathletes at the 1994 Winter Olympics
Russian female biathletes
Olympic biathletes of Russia
Place of birth missing (living people)